Parliamentary elections were held in Nauru on 24 April 2010, following the dissolution of parliament by President Marcus Stephen on 16 March 2010. The election was called due to repeated attempts to oust the government of Marcus Stephen in votes of no-confidence. There were 86 candidates, eight of them women.

Background: the 'Getax affair'
Australian officials have accused the Australian company Getax, which is an important buyer of Nauruan phosphate, of having precipitated the election by destabilising the Stephen government. Specifically, Getax had offered the Nauruan government a loan of A$25 million with a 15% interest rate, which, according to an investigative article in The Australian, "would be likely to have resulted in the country defaulting on its repayments, triggering contract provisions that would have let Getax take over the Nauru-owned phosphate industry". The Stephen government rejected the proffered loan. At the time, following the results of the 2008 election, the government had a parliamentary majority consisting in 12 MPs. Shortly thereafter, Getax organised and financed a trip to Singapore for the six opposition MPs and three of the government MPs. The latter three (including Aloysius Amwano) then joined the ranks of the opposition, causing a parliamentary stalemate, and thus the April election.

In October 2010, The Australian published an article, based on revelations by Australian officials and on documents published by the Nauruan authorities, revealing Getax's activities, as well as seemingly inexplicable spending levels by opposition MPs, well beyond the means afforded by their salaries. It also included a testimony alleging that members of the opposition had paid sums of money to potential voters. Questioned by The Australian, Baron Waqa, leader of the opposition, would neither confirm nor deny the claim that Getax had financed the opposition's campaign, but stated: "Getax has always helped Nauru. [...] Getax is disappointed with the way the country is running".

The Australian Federal Police launched an investigation into the accusations that Getax had bribed Nauruan officials (specifically, opposition and government non-Cabinet MPs) in the hopes that a new government would sign a deal with it on the selling of phosphate.

Electoral system
Nauru uses a modified Borda count electoral system in eight multi-member districts.

Results
On 26 April it was announced that provisional results indicated that every single one of the 18 members of parliament had been re-elected. This was confirmed on Monday 26 April.

Aftermath
Parliament met for a first session on Tuesday 27 April, to elect a speaker. However, all four nominated candidates were rejected. Parliament is now to resume on Thursday, with the Marcus Stephen administration continuing in a caretaker capacity.

In its third sitting on 4 May 2010, the speaker election failed yet again. After a fourth failed attempt, the opposition floated the possibility of holding another election. Following the fifth failed attempt, Stephen proposed reforms before early elections, such as electing the speaker from outside parliament to break the deadlock.

In a sixth attempt on 13 May 2010, Godfrey Thoma was finally elected speaker.  He immediately proposed to dissolve parliament again. As the government refused to do this, he resigned on 18 May 2010; it seemed possible that the two camps might form a coalition government to break the deadlock.

Progress was finally made when the government's nominee for speaker, Dominic Tabuna, was finally elected on 1 June 2010 in two rounds of balloting. Indirect presidential elections were then set for 3 June 2010. They were then postponed to 4 June 2010, and when they failed again on that date, Tabuna resigned.

Following seven weeks of deadlock, parliament was dissolved on 11 June 2010 and an early election called for 19 June 2010.

References

Nauru
Parliamentary election
2010 04
2010 04
2010